is a Japanese gymnast. She competed in six events at the 1976 Summer Olympics.

References

1961 births
Living people
Japanese female artistic gymnasts
Olympic gymnasts of Japan
Gymnasts at the 1976 Summer Olympics
Place of birth missing (living people)